Reminder is a studio album by the Norwegian band Pixel, released by Cuneiform Records on May 8, 2012 (RUNE 342).

Critical reception 

The band Pixel and the album Reminder is the exam project of bass player and vocalist Ellen Andrea Wang at Norwegian Academy of Music.
All About Jazz critique Bruce Lindsay, in his review of Pixel's album Reminder states:

The reviewer Terje Mosnes of the Norwegian newspaper Dagbladet awarded the album dice 4, and the reviewer Frode Hermanrud of the Norwegian newspaper Oppland Arbeiderblad} awarded the album dice 5.

Track listing 
All compositions by Ellen Andrea Wang
"Prelude" (2:26)
"Home" (3:03)
"Esset" (4:51)
"Call Me" (3:26)
"She Knows" (4:35)
"Wake Up" (3:48)
"Waltz 1" (3:40)
"Hvor Ble den Av?" (8:38)
"I Hang" (4:21)
"An Apple in the Country Hill" (4:17)

Personnel 
Ellen Andrea Wang – Double bass and vocals
Jon Audun Baar – Drums & percussions
Harald Lassen – Tenor & soprano saxophone and backing vocals
Jonas Kilmork Vemøy – Trumpet and backing vocals

References

External links 
Call Me single on Last.fm

Pixel (band) albums
2012 albums
Cuneiform Records albums